The 1938 Hanshin flood was caused by heavy rains, which resulted in landslides and floods in the Mount Rokkō area, Hyōgo Prefecture in Japan in July 1938. According to the official government report, torrential rains resulted in flash floods and debris flows that affected the Mount Rokko area, including Kobe and Nishinomiya.  At least 715 people lost their lives. The floods feature in Junichirō Tanizaki's novel The Marioka Sisters.

See also 

 Great Hanshin earthquake (1995)
 List of floods

References

External links 

 
 
 

July 1938 events
1938 in Japan
Floods in Japan
Landslides in Japan